Kana TV is an Ethiopian satellite television channel that airs television dramas. Launched in 2016, Kana TV is known for broadcasting Turkish television series, which gained significant marketing share. Programmes are dubbed in Amharic language, and Kana TV developed locally produced shows such as #Time, #Mindin, Kana News and Sheqela. In addition, Kana TV began launching weekly documentary program Kana Passport/National Geographic and music shows Hop.

Local content 
 #Time – a locally produced entertainment show featuring the latest music and popular trends. Hosted by presenter Danayit Mekbebe.
 #Mindin – a local production talk show that present informative current content  - local and international news, trends etc. Hosted by presenters Mikias, Kaleab and Melat.
 Kana News – A locally produced short daily news segment airing weekdays during commercial breaks in regular programming.
 #Sheqela – a local produced entertainment featuring types of strategies of the future life and trends.

Dubbed content

Foreign dramas/shows  
 Saraswatichandra / ዛራና ቻንድራ "Zara Ena Chandra" – Broadcast from April 4, 2016 – January 10, 2017
 Kara Para Aşk / ጥቁር ፍቅር "Tikur Fikir" – Broadcast from April 4, 2016 – November 16, 2016
 Kuzey Güney / ኩዚ ጉኒ "Kuzi Guni" – Broadcast from May 30, 2016 – February 14, 2017
 Fatmagül'ün Suçu Ne? / ቅጣት "Kitat" – Broadcast from November 17, 2016 – July 3, 2017
 Pasión y poder / የራስ ምርኮኛ "Yeras Mirkogna" – Broadcast from February 14, 2017 – August 4, 2017
 The Promise / ቃል ኪዳን  "Kal Kidan" – Broadcast from June 15, 2017 – September 12, 2017
 Paramparça / ሽንቁር ልቦች "Shinkur Liboch" – Broadcast from July 4, 2017 – June 17, 2018
 Avenida Brasil / የበቀል መንገድ "Yebekel Menged" – Broadcast from August 6, 2017 – February 12, 2018
 Bir Aşk Hikayesi / የፍቅር ነገር "Ye'fekir Neger" – Broadcast from January 10, 2018 – April 18, 2018
 Adini Feriha Koydum / ፈሪሀ "Feriha" – Broadcast from February 7, 2018 – August 27, 2018
 Sol Nascente / መድረሻ "Medresha" – Broadcast from April 20, 2018 – September 16, 2018
 Kaçak / ታዳኙ "Tadagnu" – Broadcast from September 16, 2018 – January 22, 2019
 İçerde / ሚስጥር "Mistir" – Broadcast from October 13, 2018 – February 22, 2019
 O'Hayati Benim / የተቀማ ህይወት "Yetekema Hiwot" – Broadcast from February 15, 2017 – May 30, 2019
 Kadın / ያልተፈታ ህልም "Yaltefeta Hilm" - Broadcast from February 23, 2019 – October 4, 2020
 Kayıp / ፍርደኞቹ "Firdegnochu" – Broadcast from May 8, 2019 – March 3, 2021
 Aşk-ı Memnu / የተከለከለ "Yetekelekele" – Broadcast from October 5, 2020 – March 31, 2021
 Zalim İstanbul / ሽሚያ "Shimya" – Broadcast from April 5, 2021 – October 8, 2021
 Siyah Beyaz Aşk / ድርና ማግ "Dir Ena Mag" – Broadcast from July 28, 2021 – December 23, 2021
 Çukur / የኛ ሰፈር "Yegna Sefer" – Broadcast from August 10, 2019 – January 3, 2022
 The Queen and the Conqueror / ካታሊና "Katalina" – Broadcast from October 8, 2021 – January 23, 2022
 Cennet'in Gözyaşları / ያልታበሰ እንባ "Yaltabese Emba" – Broadcast from October 12, 2021 – March 23, 2022
 Öyle Bir Geçer Zaman ki / ማዕበል "Maebel" – Broadcast from October 27, 2020 – May 23, 2022
 Doğduğun Ev Kaderindir / ስበት  "Sibet" – Broadcast from January 4, 2022 – July 15, 2022
 Bu Şehir Arkandan Gelecek / መልህቅ "Melhik" – Broadcast from March 24, 2022 – August 4, 2022
 Mrs. Fazilet and Her Daughters / የፋዚሌት ልጆች "Ye Fazilet Lijoich" – Broadcast from May 25, 2022 – present
 Órfãos da Terra / ፍልሰት "Filset" – Broadcast from July 22, 2022 – present

Others 
 Kana Passport/National Geographic –  a weekly documentary program covering such topics as geography, archaeology and natural sciences.

Music 
 Hop – offers back-to-back music from the region and around the world.

References

Kana TV